Farah Mahbub is the name of:

 Farah Mahbub (judge) (born 1966), Bangladeshi judge
 Farah Mahbub (photographer) (born 1965), Pakistani photographer